Bạc Liêu is a provincial city and capital of the Bạc Liêu Province in the Mekong Delta region in southern Vietnam. It is a medium-sized town with a population of approximately 150,000. The former name of the city is Vĩnh Lợi.

History

The name Bạc Liêu is based on the Chinese pronunciation of a Khmer name  (Pol Leav ពលលាវ in Khmer). In the 1950s the area was a centre of Huỳnh Phú Sổ's Hòa Hảo religion after Sổ was released there.

References

Cities in Vietnam
Districts of Bạc Liêu province
Populated places in Bạc Liêu province
Provincial capitals in Vietnam